Chaunograptus is a genus of putative graptolite known from the Middle Cambrian Burgess Shale. 11 specimens of Chaunograptus are known from the Greater Phyllopod bed, where they comprise 0.02% of the community.

References

External links 
 

Burgess Shale fossils
Graptolite genera
Cambrian genus extinctions